"Vandraren" (The Wanderer) is a song with music composed by Mats Wester and lyrics written by Py Bäckman. The song was recorded by Nordman as the opening track of their self-titled debut studio album Nordman. Becoming a major hit in Sweden, it was given the Rockbjörnen award in the "Swedish song of the year 1994" category.

The single peaked at number seven on the Swedish singles chart. Also charting at Svensktoppen, it stayed for 18 weeks on the chart between 16 July-12 November 1994, peaking at number 3.

Other versions 
In 2009, the song was recorded by Ensiferum (sung by Heri Joensen of Týr (band) ) for the album From Afar, and Ritchie Blackmore's band Blackmore's Night has recorded it as Journeyman on 2010 album Autumn Sky. In 2014, Plumbo together with Ole Evenrud, recorded the song in Norwegian as "Vandreren" for the album, Kom Som Dæ Sjæl and released the song as a single.

Charts

References

1994 singles
Nordman songs
Songs written by Py Bäckman
Swedish-language songs
1994 songs